During the 1967–68 English football season, Everton F.C. competed in the Football League First Division.

Final league table

Results

Football League First Division

FA Cup

League Cup

Squad

References

1967–68
Everton F.C. season